Vairagad is a small fort situated in the Gadchiroli district of Maharashtra, India, at the confluence of rivers Khobragadhi and Satnalas. The small dusty village of same name is adjacent to the fort. The fort is situated 180 km from Nagpur and 80 km from Chandrapur.

History
This village is supposed to have been established in Dvapara Yuga by a king named Vairacan (Son from a moon family). The city was ruled by the Mana chiefs, who about the 9th century fell to the Gonds. The Gonds ruled it along with Garbori and Rajgad. Vairagad once possessed diamond mines and are referred in the Ain-i-Akbari of Abul Fazal. On a hill at the foot were supposed to be a mine, now an old Idgah, and 108 Musalman tombs which appear to be of those soldiers killed in the battle when Ahmad Shah Bahamani of Bahmani Sultanate raided Vairagad around 1422. In 1925 the fort was declared as protected monument

Places to visit
The fortress lies north of the village spread over a  area. There are three gates at the entrance of the fort. There are many wells inside the fort. The step well with two arches, still containing water, is in a ruined state. there are two rectangular wells with large stone coverings. Presently the Archeology dept artment has taken up work of reconstruction of the main entrance. Outside the fort proper is the tomb of the Gond Prince Durga Sah and a grave of unknown English Girl who is believed to be the daughter of a British commandant of the garrison between 1818 and 1830.

About a mile from the fort stands a small temple of Bhandareshwar similar in style to the Markandeya Temple.

See also
List of forts in Maharashtra
Gadchiroli

Gallery

References

Buildings and structures of the Maratha Empire
16th-century forts in India
Forts in Vidarbha
Forts in Maharashtra